Dario Fontanarosa is the former chairman of Adelaide United FC, he is also chief executive of Bianco Building Supplies and is the son-in-law of Nick Bianco.

Biography
He earned respect amongst the Australian football (soccer) community by his handling of the post A-League 2006-07 grand final debacle.

In April, 2008, Fontanarosa revealed plans of an ambitious program to build an $475 million inner city 45,000 all-seater stadium.  

Dario is highly respected by some fans who traveled to Osaka, Japan for the final of the AFC Champions League. Dario kindly help the fans with some aptly named "Dario Dollars". 
Dario was replaced as Chairman by AUFC Director and Managing Director of award winning travel agency Airport Travel Centre Mel Patzwald.

He is a member of the Composition the Commission of Football Clubs.

References

Year of birth missing (living people)
Living people
Adelaide United FC
Australian soccer chairmen and investors